The 2018–19 Ranji Trophy was the 85th season of the Ranji Trophy, the first-class cricket tournament that took place in India. It was contested by 37 teams, divided into four groups, with nine teams in Group A. The group stage ran from 1 November 2018 to 10 January 2019. The top five teams across Group A and Group B progressed to the quarter-finals of the competition.

In the opening round of fixtures, in the match between Mumbai and Railways in Delhi, players wore masks because of the poor air quality. In the third round match between Vidarbha and Baroda, Vidarbha's Wasim Jaffer became the first batsman to score 11,000 runs in the Ranji Trophy. The ninth round match between Vidarbha and Saurashtra was Jaffer's 146th Ranji match. He broke Devendra Bundela's record of playing in the most matches in the Ranji Trophy. In the fourth round match between Gujarat and Mumbai, Gujarat beat Mumbai by nine wickets, to become the first side to have four outright victories against them.

Ahead of the fifth round of fixtures, Saurashtra's captain Jaydev Shah announced that he would retire from all cricket following the team's match against Karnataka. He set the record for the most matches as captain in the Ranji Trophy.

Vidarbha became the first team to qualify from Group A, after Baroda beat Karnataka by two wickets in their final group-stage match. Despite the loss, Karnataka also qualified from Group A. Chhattisgarh and Maharashtra across Group A and B were relegated to Group C, On the final day of the group stage, Saurashtra and Gujarat also qualified from Group A for the quarter-finals.

Points table

Fixtures

Round 1

Round 2

Round 3

Round 4

Round 5

Round 6

Round 7

Round 8

Round 9

References

Ranji Trophy seasons
Ranji Trophy Group A
Ranji Trophy
Ranji Trophy